Astrid van Koert (born 7 July 1970, in 's-Hertogenbosch) is a Dutch rower. She competed at the 1996 Summer Olympics as a member of the Netherlands women's women's eight team which finished in 6th place.

References 
 
 

1970 births
Living people
Dutch female rowers
Olympic rowers of the Netherlands
Sportspeople from 's-Hertogenbosch
Rowers at the 1996 Summer Olympics